Mantaqeh Azad Chabahar (also Romanized as Manţaqeh Āzād Chābahār) is a village in Kambel-e Soleyman Rural District, in the Central District of Chabahar County, Sistan and Baluchestan Province, Iran. At the 2006 census, its population was 39, in 11 families.

References 

Populated places in Chabahar County